Anthony Marie Gerard de Freitas (born 10 May 1994) is a French footballer who plays as a midfielder for Swiss Promotion League side FC Biel-Bienne.

A former Monaco youth team player, he spent time on loan at Monts d'Or Azergues in the Championnat de France Amateur and with Portuguese side Varzim in the LigaPro. He also won two caps for the France under-20 team. He was signed by English club Port Vale in July 2016 and stayed with the club for one-and-a-half seasons. He joined Swiss club La Chaux-de-Fonds in June 2018 and then moved on to Biel-Bienne the following year.

Playing career

Monaco II
As a youth team player with Monaco, he played for the reserve team in the Championnat de France Amateur, featuring five times in 2012–13 as Monaco II finished 12th, 17 times in the 2013–14 season as they finished in eighth place, and scoring one goal in 16 games in the 2014–15 campaign to help the club to a ninth-place finish. He also played one game on loan at Monts d'Or Azergues on 19 December 2015, scoring 19 minutes after entering the game as a substitute in a 2–2 draw with GF38. He then was loaned out to Portuguese side Varzim in the LigaPro. He made his professional debut on 31 January 2016, in a 1–1 draw with Penafiel at the Estádio do Varzim SC. He played a total of 19 games for the club, and scored his first goal in professional football on 8 May, in a 2–0 win over Oriental. Capucho led Varzim to a ninth-place finish in the league.

Port Vale
De Freitas signed a two-year contract with EFL League One club Port Vale in July 2016. Manager Bruno Ribeiro compared de Freitas to himself as a player, and said his versatility made him a key player for the "Valiants". He remained a part of the first team after Michael Brown succeeded Ribeiro as manager in December, before being sidelined for six weeks with a groin injury picked up in February. With the "Valiants" now in EFL League Two, he made 13 appearances in the first half of the 2017–18 season, before his contract was ended by mutual consent after meeting with new manager Neil Aspin in January 2018.

La Chaux-de-Fonds
In June 2018, De Freitas joined Swiss Promotion League side La Chaux-de-Fonds. He left the club at the end of the season.

Biel-Bienne
In September 2019 it was confirmed that De Freitas had joined Swiss 1. Liga side FC Biel-Bienne on a contract for the rest of 2019. On 21 November, he extended his contract with the club until the summer 2020.

International career
He was called up to play for the France under-20 team at the Jeux de la Francophonie; France did not qualify for the knockout stages after losing 3–0 to Congo in the group stage.

Style of play
Speaking in July 2016, de Freitas described himself as a "fighter". He can play across the midfield, and is also able to play at left-back.

Career statistics

References

1994 births
Living people
Footballers from Lyon
Association football midfielders
Association football fullbacks
French footballers
France youth international footballers
ASM Clermont Auvergne players
AS Monaco FC players
GOAL FC players
Varzim S.C. players
Port Vale F.C. players
FC La Chaux-de-Fonds players
FC Biel-Bienne players
Championnat National 2 players
Liga Portugal 2 players
English Football League players
Swiss Promotion League players
French expatriate footballers
French expatriate sportspeople in Portugal
Expatriate footballers in Portugal
French expatriate sportspeople in England
Expatriate footballers in England
French expatriate sportspeople in Switzerland
Expatriate footballers in Switzerland